Patrick Belton (26 June 1926 – 22 May 1987) was an Irish politician, company director and publican.

He was born on 26 June 1926 at 5 Mount Street Crescent, Dublin, the third of four sons of Patrick Belton and his wife Mary (née Fitzgibbon). He was first elected to Dáil Éireann as a Fine Gael Teachta Dála (TD) at the Dublin North-East by-election held on 30 May 1963 caused by the death of his brother Jack Belton. He was re-elected for Dublin North-East at the 1965, 1969 and 1973 general elections. He lost his seat at the 1977 general election. He served as Lord Mayor of Dublin from 1978 to 1979.

Other members of the Belton family to have served in the Oireachtas include his father Patrick Belton, his brothers Richard Belton and Jack Belton; and his niece Avril Doyle.

See also
Families in the Oireachtas

References

 

1926 births
1987 deaths
Fine Gael TDs
Members of the 17th Dáil
Members of the 18th Dáil
Members of the 19th Dáil
Members of the 20th Dáil
Politicians from County Dublin
Belton family
Lord Mayors of Dublin
People educated at Belvedere College